Telfair County High School is located in McRae–Helena, Georgia, United States. It is the only high school in the Telfair County School District. Its teams are known as the Trojans. It shares a campus with its feeder school, Telfair County Middle School.

Athletics

The Telfair County Trojans field the following sports teams:
Baseball
Basketball (Boys & Girls)
Cross Country (Boys & Girls)
Football
Golf (Boys & Girls)
Softball
Tennis (Boys & Girls)
Track & Field (Boys & Girls)
Wrestling

Postseason success
The Trojans' sports teams have found postseason success a number of times in school history, with notable successes outlined below:
Baseball: 4 Sweet Sixteen Appearances, 2 Elite Eight appearances, 1 Final Four appearance, Class A State Runner-Up (2018), Region 2-A Champion (2008).
Basketball:
Cross Country (Boys):
Cross County (Girls):
Football: 1 Sweet Sixteen appearance, 1 Elite Eight appearance, 2 Region Championships (1992, 1993)
Golf (Boys):
Golf (Girls):
Fastpitch Softball: 3 Region Championships, 5 Sweet Sixteen appearances, 4 Elite Eight appearances, 2 Final Four appearances
Tennis (Boys):
Tennis (Girls):
Track & Field (Boys):
Track & Field (Girls):
Wrestling:

References

Public high schools in Georgia (U.S. state)